Varsinais-Suomi (Egentliga Finland) is the name of a geographical region in Finland which can refer to:

Varsinais-Suomi - a historical Province of Sweden (Historical provinces of Finland)
Turun ja Porin lääni - a former Province of Finland (County of Sweden)
Varsinais-Suomen maakunta - a current Region of Finland
Western Finland - a current Province of Finland

pl:Varsinais-Suomi